The 2015 North Indian Ocean cyclone season was a below-average tropical cyclone season which featured the highest number of deaths since the 2010 season. Despite inactivity in the Bay of Bengal caused by the ongoing El Niño, the season produced an above-average number of tropical cyclones in the Arabian Sea. The first storm of the season, Ashobaa, formed on 7 June, while the final storm of the season, Megh, ultimately dissipated on 10 November.

A total of twelve depressions were recorded, of which nine intensified into deep depressions. Of these nine, a total of four further strengthened into cyclonic storms, while two attained their peaks as extremely severe cyclonic storms. In early June, Cyclonic Storm Ashobaa produced significant flooding in eastern Oman and the United Arab Emirates. Later that month, Deep Depression ARB 02 resulted in the worst floods in the Amreli district of Gujarat in 90 years. The storm resulted in 80 deaths and an estimated 16.5 billion Indian rupees in damage in the state. In late July and early August, Cyclonic Storm Komen resulted in between 187 and 280 deaths in northeastern India, Bangladesh and Myanmar due to torrential rains as it slowly moved through the region. In early November, Extremely Severe Cyclonic Storm Chapala, the strongest storm of the season, became the first recorded tropical cyclone to produce hurricane-force winds in Yemen. During the storm's passage, areas in southern Yemen received  of rainfall over 48 hours, or 700% of the average yearly precipitation. Just days after Chapala produced widespread damage in Yemen and the Puntland region of Somalia, Extremely Severe Cyclonic Storm Megh passed through the same region causing further destruction. Megh was judged to have been the worst tropical cyclone ever to affect the Yemeni island of Socotra, and resulted in 18 deaths on the island. The final storm of the season to form, Deep Depression BOB 03, produced significant flooding in southern India and resulted in at least 71 deaths in the region in early November.

Within the northern Indian Ocean, tropical cyclones were monitored by the India Meteorological Department (IMD) at the Regional Specialized Meteorological Center in New Delhi. The IMD designated tropical cyclones forming in the Arabian Sea with the prefix "ARB", tropical cyclones forming in the Bay of Bengal with the prefix "BOB" and tropical cyclones forming overland with the prefix "LAND". In addition, the United States Joint Typhoon Warning Center (JTWC) issued unofficial warnings within the region, with tropical cyclones forming in the Arabian Sea assigned the suffix "A" and tropical cyclones forming in the Bay of Bengal assigned the "B" suffix. The IMD used the IMD Tropical Cyclone Intensity Scale and measured average sustained wind speeds taken over a three-minute period, while the JTWC measured average sustained wind speeds taken over a one-minute period and used the Saffir–Simpson hurricane scale.

This timeline includes information from post-storm reviews by the IMD and the JTWC. It documents tropical cyclone formations, strengthenings, weakenings, landfalls, extratropical transition, and dissipations during the season. Reports among warning centers often differ; therefore, information from both agencies has been included.

Timeline of events

June

6 June
06:00 UTC (11:30 a.m.
7 June
03:00 UTC (8:30 a.m.
06:00 UTC (11:30 a.m.
8 June
00:00 UTC (5:30 a.m.
03:00 UTC (8:30 a.m.
9 June
18:00 UTC (11:30 p.m.
18:00 UTC (11:30 p.m.
11 June
18:00 UTC (11:30 p.m.

12 June
00:00 UTC (5:30 a.m.
06:00 UTC (11:30 a.m.
12:00 UTC (5:30 p.m.
20 June
03:00 UTC (8:30 a.m.
20:00–21:00 UTC (1:30–2:30 a.m.
22 June
00:00 UTC (5:30 a.m. IST) at  – The IMD reports that Depression BOB 01 has weakened into a well-marked low-pressure area while located over the Indian states of Odisha, Jharkhand and Chhattisgarh.
03:00 UTC (8:30 a.m.

23 June
03:00 UTC (8:30 a.m.
09:00–10:00 UTC (2:30–3:30 p.m.
24 June
12:00 UTC (5:30 p.m.
25 June
00:00 UTC (5:30 a.m. IST) at  – The IMD reports that Depression ARB 02 has weakened into a well-marked low-pressure area while located over northwestern Madhya Pradesh.

July
10 July
03:00 UTC (8:30 a.m. IST) at  – The IMD reports that Depression LAND 01 has formed while located over Jharkhand.
12 July
12:00 UTC (5:30 p.m. IST) at  – The IMD reports that Depression LAND 01 has weakened into a well-marked low-pressure area while located over northwestern Uttar Pradesh and neighboring Haryana.
26 July
00:00 UTC (5:30 a.m.
27 July
12:00 UTC (5:30 p.m. IST) at  – The IMD reports that Depression LAND 02 has formed while located over southwestern Rajasthan and neighboring Gujarat.

28 July
03:00 UTC (8:30 a.m.
06:00 UTC (11:30 a.m.
29 July
00:00 UTC (5:30 a.m.
00:00 UTC (5:30 a.m.
00:00 UTC (5:30 a.m.
18:00 UTC (11:30 p.m.
30 July
00:00 UTC (5:30 a.m.
03:00 UTC (8:30 a.m. IST) at  – The IMD reports that Depression LAND 02 has weakened into a well-marked area of low pressure while located over western Rajasthan.
06:00 UTC (11:30 a.m.
14:00–15:00 UTC (7:30–8:30 p.m.
21:00 UTC (2:30 a.m.
31 July
00:00 UTC (5:30 a.m.
12:00 UTC (5:30 p.m.

August

2 August
12:00 UTC (5:30 p.m. IST) at  – The IMD reports that Depression ex-Komen (02B) has weakened into a well-marked area of low pressure over Jharkhand and northern Odisha and Chhattisgarh.
4 August
03:00 UTC (8:30 a.m. IST) at  – The IMD reports that Depression LAND 03 has formed while located over eastern Madhya Pradesh and neighboring Chhattisgarh.
5 August
00:00 UTC (5:30 a.m. IST) at  – The IMD reports that Depression LAND 03 has weakened into a well-marked low-pressure area while located over southwestern Madhya Pradesh.

September
16 September
03:00 UTC (8:30 a.m. IST) at  – The IMD reports that Depression LAND 04 has formed from an area of low pressure while located over southern Odisha.
17 September
03:00 UTC (8:30 a.m.
18 September
03:00 UTC (8:30 a.m.
19 September
03:00 UTC (8:30 a.m. IST) at  – The IMD reports that Depression LAND 04 has weakened into a well-marked area of low pressure while located over northern Maharashtra and neighboring areas of southwestern Madhya Pradesh and Gujarat.

October
7 October
00:00 UTC (5:30 a.m.

9 October
00:00 UTC (5:30 a.m.
06:00 UTC (11:30 a.m.
12:00 UTC (5:30 p.m.
18:00 UTC (11:30 p.m.
11 October
00:00 UTC (5:30 a.m.
12 October
03:00 UTC (8:30 a.m.
06:00 UTC (11:30 a.m.
27 October
12:00 UTC (5:30 p.m.
28 October
03:00 UTC (8:30 a.m.
06:00 UTC (11:30 a.m.
12:00 UTC (5:30 p.m.

29 October
00:00 UTC (5:30 a.m.
09:00 UTC (2:30 p.m.
12:00 UTC (5:30 p.m.
30 October
00:00 UTC (5:30 a.m.
00:00 UTC (5:30 a.m.
06:00 UTC (11:30 a.m.
09:00 UTC (2:30 p.m.
31 October
06:00 UTC (11:30 a.m.

November

1 November
00:00 UTC (5:30 a.m.
18:00 UTC (11:30 p.m. This makes Chapala the first storm to produce hurricane-force winds on the island since 1922.
2 November
00:00 UTC (5:30 a.m.
12:00 UTC (5:30 p.m.
18:00 UTC (11:30 p.m.
3 November
00:00 UTC (5:30 a.m.
01:00–02:00 UTC (6:30–7:30 a.m. This makes Chapala the first storm in recorded history to make landfall with hurricane-force winds on the Yemeni mainland.
03:00 UTC (8:30 a.m.
03:00 UTC (8:30 a.m.
06:00 UTC (11:30 a.m.
18:00 UTC (11:30 p.m.
18:00 UTC (11:30 p.m.
4 November
00:00 UTC (5:30 a.m.
03:00 UTC (8:30 a.m. IST) at  – The IMD reports that Depression ex-Chapala (04A) has weakened into a well-marked area of low pressure while located over Yemen.
18:00 UTC (11:30 p.m.

5 November
7 November
06:00 UTC (11:30 a.m.
06:00 UTC (11:30 a.m.
15:00 UTC (8:30 p.m.
18:00 UTC (11:30 p.m.

8 November
00:00 UTC (5:30 a.m.
03:00 UTC (8:30 a.m.
03:00 UTC (8:30 a.m.
06:00 UTC (11:30 a.m.
06:00 UTC (11:30 a.m.
06:00–12:00 UTC (11:30 a.m.–5:30 p.m.
12:00 UTC (5:30 p.m.
18:00 UTC (11:30 p.m.
18:00 UTC (11:30 p.m.
9 November
00:00 UTC (5:30 a.m.
14:00 UTC (7:30 p.m.
21:00 UTC (2:30 a.m.

10 November
00:00 UTC (5:30 a.m.
03:00 UTC (8:30 a.m.
03:00 UTC (8:30 a.m.
06:00 UTC (11:30 a.m.
06:00 UTC (11:30 a.m. IST) at  – The IMD reports that Depression BOB 03 has weakened into a well-marked low-pressure area while located over northern Tamil Nadu.
09:00 UTC (2:30 p.m.
12:00 UTC (5:30 p.m.
12:00 UTC (5:30 p.m.
18:00 UTC (11:30 p.m. IST) at  – The IMD reports that Depression ex-Megh (05A) has weakened into a well-marked low-pressure area over Yemen.

See also
Timeline of the 2015 Atlantic hurricane season
Timeline of the 2015 Pacific hurricane season
Timeline of the 2015 Pacific typhoon season

Footnotes

References

2015 North Indian Ocean cyclone season
2015 in Yemen
2015 in Oman
2015 in Somalia
North Indian Ocean meteorological timelines
2015 NIO T